Short Sharp Shock is an album by British hardcore punk band Chaos UK, released in 1984 through Anagram Records.

Track listing
 Lawless Britain
 Living in Fear
 Detention Centre
 Support
 Control
 People At The Top
 Global Domination
 No One Seems to Really Care
 Farmyard Stomp Again

Personnel
Chaos - Bass
Gabba - Guitar
Mower - Vocals
Chuck - Drums

Chaos UK albums
1984 albums